Eze Nri Buífè was the third king of Nri Kingdom after succeeding Eze Nri Nàmóke. Succeeded by Eze Nri Ọmalọ, he reigned from 1159–1259 CE.

References

Nri-Igbo
Nri monarchs
Kingdom of Nri
12th-century monarchs in Africa
13th-century monarchs in Africa